This is a list of schools in Kwai Tsing District, Hong Kong.

Secondary schools

 Aided
 Buddhist Sin Tak College (佛教善德英文中學)
 Buddhist Yip Kei Nam Memorial College (佛教葉紀南紀念中學)
 Caritas St Joseph Secondary School (明愛聖若瑟中學)
 Carmel Alison Lam Foundation Secondary School (迦密愛禮信中學)
 CCC Chuen Yuen College (中華基督教會全完中學)
 CCC Yenching College (中華基督教會燕京書院)
 CNEC Christian College (中華傳道會安柱中學)
 CNEC Lee I Yao Memorial Secondary School (中華傳道會李賢堯紀念中學)
 Cotton Spinners Association Secondary School (棉紡會中學)
 DMHC Siu Ming Catholic Secondary School (天主教母佑會蕭明中學)
 HKSYC & IA Chan Nam Chong Memorial College (香港四邑商工總會陳南昌紀念中學)
 HKTA The Yuen Yuen Institute No. 1 Secondary School (香港道教聯合會圓玄學院第一中學)
 Ju Ching Chu Secondary School (Kwai Chung) (裘錦秋中學（葵涌）)
 Kiangsu-Chekiang College (Kwai Chung) (葵涌蘇浙公學)
 Kwai Chung Methodist College (葵涌循道中學)
 Lai King Catholic Secondary School (荔景天主教中學)
 Lingnan Dr Chung Wing Kwong Memorial Secondary School (嶺南鍾榮光博士紀念中學)
 Lions College (獅子會中學)
 Lok Sin Tong Ku Chiu Man Secondary School (樂善堂顧超文中學)
 Lok Sin Tong Leung Chik Wai Memorial School (樂善堂梁植偉紀念中學)
 Methodist Lee Wai Lee College (李惠利中學)
 Po Leung Kuk Lo Kit Sing (1983) College (保良局羅傑承（一九八三）中學)
 Pope Paul VI College (保祿六世書院)
 Queen's College Old Boys' Association Secondary School (皇仁舊生會中學)
 Salesians of Don Bosco Ng Siu Mui Secondary School (天主教慈幼會伍少梅中學)
 Shek Lei Catholic Secondary School (石籬天主教中學)
 SKH Lam Woo Memorial Secondary School (聖公會林護紀念中學)
 STFA Lee Shau Kee College (順德聯誼總會李兆基中學)
 TWGH Chen Zao Men College (東華三院陳兆民中學)
 TWGH Mrs Wu York Yu Memorial College (東華三院伍若瑜夫人紀念中學)
 TWGH SC Gaw Memorial College (東華三院吳祥川紀念中學)

Primary schools

 Aided
 Asbury Methodist Primary School (亞斯理衛理小學)
 Buddhist Lam Bing Yim Memorial School (sponsored by the Hong Kong Buddhist Association) (佛教林炳炎紀念學校（香港佛教聯合會主辦）)
 Buddhist Lim Kim Tian Memorial Primary School (佛教林金殿紀念小學)
 CCC Chuen Yuen Second Primary School (中華基督教會全完第二小學)
 CCC Kei Chun Primary School (中華基督教會基真小學)
 CCC Cho Yiu Primary School (祖堯天主教小學)
 CNEC Lui Ming Choi Primary School (中華傳道會呂明才小學)
 CNEC Ta Tung School (中華傳道會許大同學校)
 ELCHK Kwai Shing Lutheran Primary School (基督教香港信義會葵盛信義學校)
 Father Cucchiara Memorial School (郭怡雅神父紀念學校)
 PLK Chan Yat Primary School (保良局陳溢小學)
 Po Leung Kuk Castar Primary School (保良局世德小學)
 S.K.H. Tsing Yi Chu Yan Primary School (聖公會青衣主恩小學)
 S.K.H. Yan Laap Memorial Primary School (聖公會仁立紀念小學)
 Salesian Yip Hon Millennium Primary School (慈幼葉漢千禧小學)
 Salesian Yip Hon Primary School (慈幼葉漢小學)
 Shek Lei Catholic Primary School (石籬天主教小學)
 Shek Lei St. John's Catholic Primary School (石籬聖若望天主教小學)
 SKH Chu Oi Primary School (聖公會主愛小學)
 SKH Chu Yan Primary School (聖公會主恩小學)
 SKH Ho Chak Wan Primary School (聖公會何澤芸小學)
 SKH Tsing Yi Estate Ho Chak Wan Primary School (聖公會青衣邨何澤芸小學)
 SKH Yan Laap Primary School (聖公會仁立小學)
 SRBCEPSA Lu Kwong Fai Memorial School (柏立基教育學院校友會盧光輝紀念學校)
 Tsing Yi Trade Association Primary School (青衣商會小學)
 Tsuen Wan Trade Association Primary School (荃灣商會學校
 TWGH Chow Yin Sum Primary School (東華三院周演森小學)
 T.W.G.HS Ko Ho Ning Memorial Primary School (東華三院高可寧紀念小學)
 TWGH Wong See Sum Primary School (東華三院黃士心小學)
 YCH Chiu Tsang Hok Wan Primary School (仁濟醫院趙曾學韞小學)

 Direct Subsidy Scheme
 Delia (Man Kiu) English Primary School (地利亞（閩僑）英文小學)

Special schools

 Aided
 HKSYC & IA Chan Nom Chong Memorial School (香港四邑商工總會陳南昌紀念學校)
 Hong Chi Winifred Mary Cheung Morninghope School (匡智張玉瓊晨輝學校)
 Hong Kong Red Cross Hospital Schools Kwai Chung Hospital (香港紅十字會醫院學校)
 Lutheran School for the Deaf (路德會啓聾學校)
 PLK Mr & Mrs Chan Pak Keung Tsing Yi School (保良局陳百強伉儷青衣學校)
 SAHK B M Kotewall Memorial School (香港耀能協會羅怡基紀念學校)
 Sam Shui Natives Association Lau Pun Cheung School (三水同鄉會劉本章學校)

Former schools
 Government
  (下葵涌官立中學)
  (上葵涌官立中學)

 Other
 Po Leung Kuk Tsing Yi Secondary School (Skill Opportunity)

References

Lists of schools in Hong Kong
Kwai Tsing District